The 44th New Brunswick Legislative Assembly represented New Brunswick between November 17, 1960, and March 12, 1963.

Joseph Leonard O'Brien was Lieutenant-Governor of New Brunswick.

Ernest Richard was chosen as speaker.

The Liberal Party led by Louis Robichaud defeated the Progressive Conservatives to form the government.  The Liberals promised, among other things, to reform sales of alcoholic beverages, to build a canal across the Isthmus of Chignecto, and to re-open the moose hunt.

History

Members

Notes

References
 
 Canadian Parliamentary Guide, 1963, PG Normandin

Terms of the New Brunswick Legislature
1960 establishments in New Brunswick
1963 disestablishments in New Brunswick
20th century in New Brunswick